Posthumous, is an album by saxophonist Warne Marsh recorded in 1985 but not and released on the Interplay label until 1987. The album was rereleased on the Dutch Storyville label as Newly Warne in 1989 with slightly different track titles and an additional recording from the same session.

Reception 

Allmusic states, "Strong mid-'80s material by tenor saxophonist Warne Marsh that for some reason was not issued until he died in 1987. It featured Marsh in a much looser, fiery style than usual, without the exacting, complex lines and lengthy constructions he usually employed".

Track listing 
All compositions by Warne Marsh except where noted.
 "Unheard of" aka "Unheard" – 5:35
 "Things Called Love" aka "What Is This?" – 5:40
 "Inside Out" – 7:21
 "Parisienne Thoroughfare" (Bud Powell) – 4:30
 "Emperor's Old Cloth" aka "Emperor's Old Clothes" (Susan Chen) – 6:05
 "At First Blush" – 6:32
 "Beautiful Love Fades Out" – 5:10
 "Turn Out the Night" – 2:42
 "On a Slow Boat to China" (Frank Loesser) – 4:07 Bonus track on Newly Warne

Personnel 
Warne Marsh – tenor saxophone
Susan Chen – piano
George Mraz – bass
Akira Tana – drums

References 

Warne Marsh albums
1987 albums
Interplay Records albums
Storyville Records albums